Sito Pons 500cc Grand Prix is a 1990 racing video game developed and published by the Spanish company Zigurat Software (previously known as Made in Spain) for Amstrad CPC, MS-DOS, MSX and ZX Spectrum. Featuring former Spanish racer Sito Pons and themed around motorcycle racing, the game pit players driving the Honda NSR500 with races against AI-controlled opponents across various countries to qualify in the 500cc class of the Grand Prix motorcycle racing.

Sito Pons 500cc Grand Prix was created in conjunction with Carlos Sainz: World Rally Championship at the end of the golden age of Spanish software by most of the same team at Zigurat who worked on previous licensed sports titles such as Paris-Dakar (1988) and Emilio Sanchez Vicario Grand Slam. Zigurat approached Sito Pons to act as endorser due to their local market and motorsports being a hobby among Zigurat staff. Conversions for Amiga and Atari ST were planned but never released. 

Sito Pons 500cc Grand Prix was met with mostly positive reception from critics across all platforms since its release; praise was given to the graphics, realism and sense of speed but criticism was geared towards the high difficulty level and sound design. The title was included as part of the Pack Powersports compilation for all platforms in 1991.

Gameplay 

Sito Pons 500cc Grand Prix is a top-down motorcycle racing game similar to Aspar GP Master (1988), where players observe from above and race as Spanish motorcycle driver Sito Pons driving the Honda NSR500 across 14 countries conforming the 500cc class Grand Prix motorcycle racing like the United States, Spain, Italy, Germany, Austria and Yugoslavia. The game uses a isometric perspective as Carlos Sainz: World Rally Championship to portray a TV-style viewpoint.

Sito Pons 500cc has three modes of play: Race, Practice and Demo. Race is the main championship mode where players are pitted against AI-controlled racers such as Kevin Schwantz and Wayne Rainey to qualify. Finishing each race will allow the player to achieve a certain number of standings points, depending on the position the player finishes in; a first-place finish rewards a maximum of 20 points for each track, and the total maximum number of points possible is 280. Players can also resume their progress via password. Practice mode is recommended for beginners to train in any of the available courses without opponents. Demo mode allows players to view gameplay with an AI-controlled Pons.

Development and release 

Sito Pons 500cc Grand Prix was created in conjunction with Carlos Sainz: World Rally Championship at the end of the golden age of Spanish software by Zigurat Software (previously Made in Spain), whose team worked on previous licensed sports titles such as Paris-Dakar (1988) and Emilio Sanchez Vicario Grand Slam (featuring former Spanish tennis player Emilio Sánchez). The project was handled by three members: Fernando Rada and Carlos Granados acted as co-programmers. Artist Jorge Granados was responsible for the visuals and design for all versions, while all three members served as designers. 

The team recounted the project's development process through interviews, stating that Zigurat approached to former Spanish motorcycle racer Sito Pons to act as endorser of the game due to their local market and motorsports being a hobby among Zigurat staff. Sito Pons shares the same isometric perspective as Carlos Sainz: World Rally, however Zigurat placed more emphasis into AI for the opposing racers. Carlos stated that Rada and Jorge were in charge of the game's driving aspect.

Sito Pons 500cc Grand Prix was published exclusively in Spain by Zigurat Software for Amstrad CPC, MS-DOS, MSX and ZX Spectrum in 1990. The MSX version was also distributed by Erbe Software. The CPC version featured more colors on-screen compared to the MSX and ZX Spectrum versions, which displayed less colors on-screen. Versions for the Amiga and Atari ST were planned but never released. In 1991, the title was included as part of the Pack Powersports compilation for all platforms.

Reception 

Sito Pons 500cc Grand Prix was met with mostly positive reception from critics across all platforms since its release. Spanish magazine MicroHobby reviewed the ZX Spectrum version, praising the realism, sense of speed, television broadcast-style perspective, colorful graphics and addictive playability, describing it as a "neatly carried out" game. Micromanías José Emilio Barbero reviewed the Amstrad CPC version, commending the pseudo-3D perspective, detailed visuals, realism, accurate controls and "incredibly good" scrolling. However, Emilio Barbero criticized the excessively high difficulty and sound design due to an unpleasant and continuous sound of the motorcycle's engine. Barbero also gave a brief outlook to the ZX Spectrum version, criticizing the less colorful and detailed visuals, as well as the high difficulty but praised it for retaining the same technical performance as the Amstrad CPC version.

Reviewing the MSX version, MSX Clubs Jesús Manuel Montané drew comparison with titles such as Aspar GP Master due to its premise, criticizing the monochrome graphics and high difficulty level but remarked that its scheme was valid, stating that the game was moderately entertaining. In a retrospective outlook, IGN Spains Víctor Ayora regarded Sito Pons 500cc as one of the very best games released on 8-bit computers. Ayora stated that Sito Pons successfully implemented isometric perspective and speed but noted its extreme difficulty. When comparing each platform, he noted that the Amstrad CPC version was the best graphics-wise compared to the ZX Spectrum version due to the increased color palette, though he also reported that every version played nearly the same gameplay-wise.

References

External links 

 Sito Pons 500cc Grand Prix at GameFAQs
 Sito Pons 500cc Grand Prix at MobyGames

1990 video games
Amstrad CPC games
Cancelled Amiga games
Cancelled Atari ST games
DOS games
Motorcycle video games
MSX games
Racing video games
Single-player video games
Top-down racing video games
Video games developed in Spain
Video games set in Australia
Video games set in Austria
Video games set in Belgium
Video games set in England
Video games set in France
Video games set in Germany
Video games set in Hungary
Video games set in Italy
Video games set in Spain
Video games set in Sweden
Video games set in the United States
ZX Spectrum games
Zigurat (company) games